The 2012 United States Senate election in Texas was held on November 6, 2012, along with other elections to the United States Senate the United States House of Representatives in additional states. Incumbent Republican U.S. Senator Kay Bailey Hutchison decided to retire instead of running for reelection to a fourth full term. This was the first open seat in this seat since 1952.

Libertarian John Jay Myers was elected by nomination at the Texas Libertarian Party State Convention on June 8, 2012. After the first round of primary voting on May 29, 2012, a runoff was held on July 31, 2012, for both the Democratic Party and Republican Party. Former State Representative Paul Sadler and former State Solicitor General Ted Cruz respectively won the Democratic and Republican runoffs; Cruz won the general election by a wide margin.

Background 
In an interview with Texas Monthly published in December 2007, incumbent U.S. Senator Kay Bailey Hutchison stated that she would not seek reelection and might also resign from the Senate as early as 2009 to run for Governor of Texas. After the 2008 elections, Hutchison formed an exploratory committee to run for the governorship in 2010. State Republican Party Chairman Cathie Adams later called upon Hutchison to clarify when she would vacate the Senate so that other Republican candidates could make preparations to run.

On December 4, 2008, Hutchison set up an exploratory committee, setting up a primary battle with incumbent Republican Governor Rick Perry. Fellow Texas U.S. Senator and National Republican Senatorial Committee Chairman John Cornyn tried to convince Hutchison to stay in the Senate, for fear of losing the seat to the Democrats. On January 15, 2009, Hutchison transferred nearly all the money, approximately $8 million, from her federal campaign account to her gubernatorial exploratory committee. On November 13, 2009, Hutchison announced that she would not resign from the Senate seat until after the primary on March 2, 2010.

Hutchison lost the gubernatorial primary to Perry and on March 31, 2010, she announced her intention to serve out her third term. On January 13, 2011, after some discussion about whether she would change her mind, Hutchison announced she would not seek re-election in 2012.

Requirements for nomination 
Texas requires a majority for nomination, as well as a second round runoff between the two candidates with the two highest pluralities if none win a majority on the first round. No candidate won a majority in either 2012 major party first round primary, so both parties had a runoff on July 31, 2012.

Republican primary

Candidates

Declared 
 Glenn Addison, funeral home owner
 Joe Agris, plastic surgeon
 Curt Cleaver, owner of a hotel sales, consulting, and management company
 Ted Cruz, former State Solicitor General
 David Dewhurst, Texas Lieutenant Governor
 Ben Gambini
 Charles Holcomb, retired judge from the Texas Court of Criminal Appeals
 Craig James, sports commentator and former professional football player
 Tom Leppert, former mayor of Dallas
 Lela Pittenger, mediator

Withdrew 
 Elizabeth Ames Jones, Texas Railroad Commissioner (withdrew to run for state senate)
 Florence Shapiro, Texas state senator (dropped out)
 Michael Williams, former Texas Railroad Commissioner (withdrew to run for U.S. House)
 Roger Williams, former Texas Secretary of State (withdrew to run for U.S. House)

Declined 
 Kay Bailey Hutchison, incumbent U.S. senator
 Robert Paul, doctor and son of Ron Paul
 Ron Paul, U.S. Representative (running for President)
 Dan Patrick, Texas state senator

Endorsements

Polling 

  Commissioned by David Dewhurst
  Commissioned by Dan Patrick

Results

Runoff

Polling

Results

Democratic primary

Candidates

Filed 
 Addie Allen, disaster assistance employee for the Department of Homeland Security
 Sean Hubbard, businessman
 Paul Sadler, attorney and former state Representative
 Grady Yarbrough, retired teacher

Withdrew 
 Daniel Boone, retired Air Force Colonel (withdrew to run for 21st U.S. Congressional District in Texas; lost in Democratic primary)
 Jason Gibson, President of the Houston Trial Lawyers Association (filed, but dropped out in February 2012)
 Ricardo Sanchez, former United States Army Lieutenant General (dropped out)

Declined 
 Julian Castro, Mayor of San Antonio
 Adrian Garcia, Harris County sheriff
 Ron Kirk, U.S. trade representative and former Mayor of Dallas
 Nick Lampson, former U.S. representative
 John Sharp, former Texas Comptroller of Public Accounts
 Leticia Van de Putte, Texas state senator
 Bill White, former Mayor of Houston, originally announced that he would be running for the seat when it is vacated by Hutchison. On December 4, 2009, White announced that he was running for governor instead. After receiving the Democratic nomination for governor and losing the general election, White declared on November 15, 2010, that he would not run for the U.S. Senate in 2012.

Polling

Results

Runoff

Libertarian Party nomination 
The Libertarian Party was qualified for the ballot (based on its 2010 performance at the polls). The Texas Libertarian Party nominated John Jay Myers as its Senate candidate, using approval voting on June 9 at the state convention in Fort Worth. The nominating process followed a two-round debate featuring six candidates for the nomination.

Candidates 
 Robert Butler
 Wayne Huffman
 Scott Jameson
 John Jay Myers, restaurant owner
 S. Ropal Raju
 Jon Roland

Results

Green Party nomination 
The Green Party of Texas reported two candidates pre-selected at the June 9 convention: David B. Collins and Victoria Ann Zabaras. Collins was ultimately nominated (official blog).

General election

Candidates 
 Ted Cruz, (Republican) former State Solicitor General
 Paul Sadler, (Democratic) former State Representative
 John Jay Myers, (Libertarian) restaurant owner
 David Collins (Green), IT service desk analyst
 Chris Tina Bruce (Independent)
 Mike Champion (Independent)

Debates 
Complete video of debate, October 2, 2012 - C-SPAN
Complete video of debate, October 19, 2012 - C-SPAN

Fundraising

Top contributors

Top industries

Predictions

Polling 

with David Dewhurst

with Julian Castro

with Chet Edwards

with Sean Hubbard

with Tommy Lee Jones

with Paul Sadler

with Ricardo Sanchez

with John Sharp

with Bill White

Republican primary (when asked specifically, if Dewhurst were not running)

Results

See also 
 2012 United States Senate elections
 2012 United States House of Representatives elections in Texas

Notes

References

External links 
 Elections Division from the Texas Secretary of State
 Campaign contributions at OpenSecrets
 Outside spending at Sunlight Foundation
 Candidate issue positions at On the Issues
Official campaign websites (Archived)
 Ted Cruz
 Paul Sadler
 John Jay Myers
 Tom Leppert
 Lela Pittenger
 Craig James
 David Dewhurst
 Andrew Castanuela
 Glenn Addison
 Stanley Garza
 Sean Hubbard*

Runoff voting
United States Senate
Texas
2012
Ted Cruz